Taiwan Open may refer to:

Tennis
 WTA Taiwan Open, an international level WTA tournament, 2016–2018
 Taipei Women's Championship or Taiwan Open, a defunct WTA tournament, 1986–89 and 1992–94
 Taipei Open or Taiwan Open, a WTA 125k level tournament

Other sports
 Taiwan Open (golf), a tournament in Taiwan, 1965–2006
 Taiwan Ladies Open, a professional golf tournament in Taiwan on the Ladies European Tour
 Taiwan Open of Surfing, an Asian Surfing Championships tournament in Jinzun Harbor, Taitung, Taiwan
 Taipei Open (badminton), a BWF-sanctioned international badminton championship